Hlubeck Glacier is a glacier  west of Long Glacier in southeast Thurston Island, Antarctica. It flows south along the east side of Shelton Head into the Abbot Ice Shelf. The glacier was named by the Advisory Committee on Antarctic Names after aviation radioman Vernon R. Hlubeck, a PBM Mariner aircrewman in the Eastern group of U.S. Navy Operation Highjump, which obtained aerial photographs of Thurston Island and adjoining coastal areas, 1946–47.

See also
 List of glaciers in the Antarctic
 Glaciology

Maps
 Thurston Island – Jones Mountains. 1:500000 Antarctica Sketch Map. US Geological Survey, 1967.
 Antarctic Digital Database (ADD). Scale 1:250000 topographic map of Antarctica. Scientific Committee on Antarctic Research (SCAR). Since 1993, regularly upgraded and updated.

References

 

Glaciers of Thurston Island